Andreina Sacco (2 February 1904 - 22 July 1988) was an Italian multifaceted athlete.

Seven-time national champion at individual senior level.

National records
 High jump: 1.41 m ( Imola, 14 September 1924) - record holder until 15 July 1928.

National titles
Italian Athletics Championships
Long jump: 1925 (1)
High jump: 1924, 1925 (2)
Discus throw: 1925 (1)
Two-handed shot put: 1925, 1926 (2)
Mixed jump: 1926 (1)

References

External links
 Andreina Sacco  at Treccani

1904 births
1988 deaths
Italian female high jumpers
Italian female long jumpers
Italian female discus throwers
Sportspeople from Turin
20th-century Italian women